Street Hassle is the eighth solo studio album by American musician Lou Reed, released in February 1978 by Arista Records. Richard Robinson and Reed produced the album. It is the first commercially released pop album to employ binaural recording technology. Street Hassle combines live concert tapes (with overdubs) and studio recordings.

Production
All of the songs on Street Hassle were written by Reed, including "Real Good Time Together", a track that dates back to his days as a member of the Velvet Underground. Recording of a live album began in Munich and Ludwigshafen, West Germany. Unlike most live albums, the audience is completely muted from the mix during the concert recordings. Upon returning to the United States in August 1977, Arista Records told Reed releasing a live album was not an option, which began the NYC studio phase of the album. Then, producer Richard Robinson left the project after a fight in the studio. Determined to carry on, Reed moved the proceedings to Record Plant studios, accompanied by his recording engineer, Rod O’Brien.

Encouragement to focus and expand on the title song, "Street Hassle", came from Arista President Clive Davis, resulting in a three-part suite 11 minutes in length. The only song to be wholly written and recorded in the studio, culminating in a lyric by Reed, "Tramps like us, we were born to pay". After his engineer advised him that line belonged to somebody else, they both went downstairs, where Bruce Springsteen was working on his fourth album, which would be titled Darkness on the Edge of Town. Not only did Springsteen allow his "Born To Run" phrase to be used, he personally sang the line at Reed's request. By all accounts, the part was completed in one or two takes, to the mutual satisfaction of both. Springsteen was not credited for his performance in the liner notes of Street Hassle due to a policy set by his record label, Columbia Records.

Binaural recording

The recording of Street Hassle was notable in that Reed and his co-producer chose to employ an experimental microphone placement technique called binaural recording. In binaural recording, two microphones are placed in the studio in an attempt to mimic the stereo sound of actually being in the room with the performers/instruments. In the case of the recording sessions and concerts that composed Street Hassle, engineers used a mannequin head with a microphone implanted in each ear. Binaural recordings are generally only effective when the user listens to the album through headphones, and do not generally translate correctly through stereo speakers.

Reed's particular binaural recording system was developed by Manfred Schunke of the German company Delta Acoustics; Schunke is credited as an engineer on Street Hassle. Reed would continue to use the binaural recording style on two more releases: the 1978 concert album Live: Take No Prisoners and the 1979 studio album The Bells.

Songs and composition
As was common on early Reed solo albums, Street Hassle contained a song originally written during Reed's days in the Velvet Underground—in this case, "Real Good Time Together," which had been previously released in 1974 on 1969: The Velvet Underground Live. "Dirt" is allegedly about his ex-manager, Steve Katz.

AllMusic editor Mark Deming has written that "the title cut, a three-movement poetic tone poem about life on the New York streets, is one of the most audacious and deeply moving moments of Reed's solo career." Biographer Anthony DeCurtis describes the album as being largely motivated by and representative of the end of Reed's three-year relationship with Rachel Humphreys, a trans woman who is believed to have died of AIDS in 1990 and been buried in a Potter's Field on Hart Island in the Bronx. DeCurtis summarizes the title track as "something of a requiem for Reed and Rachel's relationship." In a 1979 article for Rolling Stone, Mikal Gilmore refers to Humphreys as the "raison d'être" for the album as a whole.

Critical reception

Street Hassle was met with mostly positive reviews, such as from Rolling Stones Tom Carson, who called the album "brilliant" and "a confession of failure that becomes a stunning, incandescent triumph—the best solo album Lou Reed has ever done." Robert Christgau of The Village Voice, however, gave the album a lukewarm reception, observing that "despite the strength of much of the material," he found the album's "production muddled, its cynicism uninteresting, [and] its self-reference self-serving." Tim Lott of the Record Mirror said, "Lou Reed has been a musical corpse for years now. Street Hassle is a creative nadir." 

In a retrospective review for AllMusic, Mark Deming noted that while "time has magnified its flaws," Street Hassle was "still among the most powerful and compelling albums [Reed] released during the 1970s, and too personal and affecting to ignore."

Track listing
All tracks written by Lou Reed.

Side one
"Gimmie Some Good Times" – 3:15
"Dirt" – 4:43
"Street Hassle" – 10:53
A. "Waltzing Matilda" – 3:20
B. "Street Hassle" – 3:31
C. "Slipaway" – 4:02

Side two
"I Wanna Be Black" – 2:55
"Real Good Time Together" – 3:21
"Shooting Star" – 3:11
"Leave Me Alone" – 4:44
"Wait" – 3:13

Personnel
Adapted from the Street Hassle liner notes.

Musicians
 Lou Reed – guitar, bass guitar, piano, vocals
 Stuart Heinrich – guitar on "Street Hassle", backing vocals on "Leave Me Alone"
 Michael Fonfara – piano on "I Wanna Be Black" and "Shooting Star"
 Marty Fogel – saxophone
 Steve Friedman – bass guitar on "Leave Me Alone"
 Jeffrey Ross – lead guitar, backing vocals on live recorded tracks (uncredited in liner notes)
 Michael Suchorsky – drums
 Aram Schefrin – string arrangement
 Genya Ravan – backing vocals
 Jo'Anna Kameron – backing vocals
 Angela Howard – backing vocals
 Christine Wiltshire – backing vocals
 Bruce Springsteen – spoken word on "Street Hassle: Slipaway" (uncredited in liner notes)

Production
 Lou Reed – producer; mixing
 Richard Robinson – producer
 Rod O'Brien – engineer; mixing
 Manfred Schunke – engineer of live recordings
 Heiner Friesz – engineer of live recordings
 Gray Russell – assistant engineer
 Gregg Caruso – assistant engineer
 Ted Jensen – mastering at Sterling Sound

Charts

Weekly charts

See also
 List of albums released in 1978
 Lou Reed's discography
 Binaural recording

References

1978 albums
Lou Reed albums
Albums produced by Lou Reed
Arista Records albums
Binaural recordings